George Hickes, Jr.  is a Canadian politician, who was elected to represent the district of Iqaluit-Tasiluk in the Legislative Assembly of Nunavut in the 2013 election, defeating sitting Nunavut Premier Eva Aariak.

Born in Churchill, Manitoba, Hickes is the son of George Hickes, the former speaker of the Legislative Assembly of Manitoba, and the cousin of former Nunavut MP, Hunter Tootoo and hockey player Jordin Tootoo. Prior to his election to the legislature, Hickes worked as a civil servant in the government of Nunavut, and as a communications manager for Qulliq Energy.

Hickes was elected to Cabinet in the 4th Legislative Assembly of Nunavut on November 9, 2015. He was first named Minister responsible for the Nunavut Housing Corporation and Minister responsible for the Qulliq Energy Corporation in November 2015, and then held the portfolios of Minister of Health and Minister responsible for Suicide Prevention as of June 2016. Minister Hickes now holds the Minister of Finance portfolio.

References

Living people
Members of the Executive Council of Nunavut
Members of the Legislative Assembly of Nunavut
Inuit from Nunavut
Inuit politicians
People from Iqaluit
People from Churchill, Manitoba
21st-century Canadian politicians
Year of birth missing (living people)